Eastern Hongshuihe Zhuang is a Northern Tai language spoken in Guangxi, China, south of the Qian River and the eastern stretch of the Hongshui River.

References

Tai languages